Näckrosen (meaning the water lily) is a station on the Stockholm metro, blue line. The station is located in Solna Municipality (northwestern end of Råsunda area), but one of the entrances is in Sundbyberg Municipality (Storskogen square). The Näckrosen station was opened on 31 August 1975 as part the first stretch of the Blue Line between T-Centralen and Hjulsta. The trains were running via Hallonbergen and Rinkeby. It is located deep underground under a residential area, close to the Gamla Filmstaden former movie production area.

Gallery

References

External links

Images of Näckrosen

Blue line (Stockholm metro) stations
Railway stations opened in 1975